Enok Mikael Svonni (born 3 September 1950) is a Swedish Sámi linguist, professor, and translator.

Early life
Svonni grew up in a reindeer-herding family in the Gabna Sami village in the municipality of Kiruna, spending the first two years of his life living in a peat goahti. One of the places he spent time was at his family's camp on Lake Rautas.

Career
In 1993, he successfully defended his dissertation at Umeå University on the Sámi spoken by Sámi schoolchildren, a topic which many of his publications are devoted to. From that year until 2008, Svonni worked as a professor of Sami Language Studies at the Department of Language Studies at Umeå University. In 2008, he was named professor of Sámi Linguistics at the University of Tromsø where he worked until his retirement in 2017

During his academic career, he published scientific articles about Sámi in schools and later on worked on grammatical issues in Sámi.

As a translator, he has translated books like Astrid Lindgren's Ronia, the Robber's Daughter and August Strindberg's A Dream Play into Northern Sámi.

Awards
He won the Gollegiella language award in 2014 in recognition and appreciation of the many years he has dedicated to the Northern Sámi language in Sweden.

Personal life
He is married to Inez Svonni Fjällström, with whom he has three children. They live in Rávttas, north of Kiruna. Together, they founded a publishing house called Ravda Lágádus in order to publish a wider range of non-fiction, fiction, and children's books in Sámi.

Selected bibliography 

 Svonni, Mikael. Davvisámegiela-ruoŧagiela, ruoŧagiela-davvisámegiela sátnegirji. Nordsamisk-svensk, svensk-nordsamisk ordbok. Karasjok: ČálliidLágádus 2013 405 s. Universitetet i Tromsø
 Svonni, Mikael. Nuppi sátnegirjjis nuppi sátnegirjái — movt ovddit sátnegirjjit lea váikkuhan maŋit, hámiid ja sániid dáfus. Sámis 2013 (13) s. 12-19. Universitetet i Tromsø
 Svonni, Mikael. Johan Turi giella girjjis Muitalus sámiid birra: Veahkkevearbbaid ortnet ja posišuvdna. Sámi dieđalaš áigecála 2012 s. 25-47. Universitetet i Tromsø
 Svonni, Mikael. Language change among the Jukkasjärvi Sami. Veröffentlichungen der Societas Uralo-Altaica 2012 s. 233—242. Universitetet i Tromsø
 Svonni, Mikael. Johan Turi: first author of the Sami. Scandinavian Studies 2011; Volum 83.(4) s. 483—490. Universitetet i Tromsø
 Svonni, Mikael. Johan Turi — muitaleaddji ja čálli. Sámis 2010; Volum 8. s. 18-25. Universitetet i Tromsø
 Svonni, Mikael. Loahppasánit [Efterord]. I: Johan Turi: Muitalus sámiid birra. CálliidLágádus 2010. . s. 193—198. Universitetet i Tromsø
 Svonni, Mikael. Samiska termer för ingifta personer — ett historiskt perspektiv. I: Samer som «de andra», samer om «de andra»: identitet och etnicitet i nordiska kulturmöten. Umeå: Umeå universitet 2010. . s. 11-30. Universitetet i Tromsø
 Svonni, Mikael. Samerna i språkhistorien. I: För Sápmi i tiden. Nordiska museets och Skansens årsbok 2008. Stockholm: Nordiska museets förlag 2008. . s. 32-42. Universitetet i Tromsø
 Svonni, Mikael. Sámi languages in the Nordic countries and Russia. I: Multilingual Europe: Facts and Policies. Mouton de Gruyter 2008. . s. 233—249. Universitetet i Tromsø
 Svonni, Mikael. Det tveeggade skolsystemet. Undervisningen av samernas barn i Sverige under 1900-talet fram till 1980. I: Mer än ett språk. En antologi om flerspråkigheten i norra Sverige. : Norstedts Akademiska Förlag 2007. . s. 94-123. Universitetet i Tromsø
 Svonni, Mikael. Subjeavtta sadji ja finihtta cealkagiid struktuvra davvisámegielas. Sámi dieđalaš áigecála 2007 (1-2) s. 85-102. Universitetet i Tromsø
 Svonni, Mikael. Vearbakomplemeanttat davvisámegiela cealkagiin. Mémoires de la Société Finno-Ougrienne 2007 (253) s. 373—387. Universitetet i Tromsø
 Amft, Andrea; Svonni, Mikael 2006: Sápmi Y1K — Livet i samernas bosättningsområde för ett tusen år sedan. : Sámi dutkan — Samiska studier — Umeå universitet 2006 170 s. Sámi dutkan — Samiska studier — Sami studies(3). Universitetet i Tromsø
 Svonni, Mikael. Legenden om Riihmmagállis — Mannen från Rávttasjávri. I: Grenzgänger. Festschrift zum 65. Geburtstag von Jurij Kusmenko. Berlin: Nordeuropa-Institut der Humboldt-Universität 2006. . s. 315—329. Universitetet i Tromsø
 Svonni, Mikael. Umesamiskan — Det gåtfulla språket. I: Sápmi Y1K — Livet i samernas bosättningsområde för ett tusen år sedan. : Sámi dutkan — Samiska studier — Umeå universitet 2006. . s. 151—170. Universitetet i Tromsø
 Svonni, Mikael. Samiska språk. I: Nordens språk med rötter och fötter. Köpenhamn: Norden, Nordiska ministerrådet 2004. . s. 97-111. Universitetet i Tromsø
 Svonni, Mikael; Vinka, Mikael. Constraints on the Morphological Causatives in the Torne Dialect of North Sámi. I: Generative approaches to Finnic and Saami linguistics: Case, features and constraints. Stanford, California: CSLI 2003. . s. 343—380. Universitetet i Tromsø
 Hyltenstam, Kenneth; Stroud, Christopher; Svonni, Mikael. Språkbyte, språkbevarande, revitalisering. Samiskans ställning i svenska Sápmi. I: Sveriges sju inhemska språk — ett minoritetsspråksperspektiv. Studentlitteratur 1999. . s. 41-97. Universitetet i Tromsø
 Svonni, Mikael. Det tveeggade skolsystemet. En studie av samebarnens skolundervisning i Sverige under 1900-talet. Samiska studier. Umeå universitet.
 Svonni, Mikael. Hupmá go oktage sámegiela čuođi jagi geahčen. Giellamolsun vai giellaseailluheapmi — eavttuid ja miellaguottuid gažaldat. I: Vesa Guttorm (red.) Giellačállosat III. Dieđut 1998:1. Sámi Instituhtta
 Svonni, Mikael. Skolor och språkundervisning för en inhemsk minoritet — samerna. I: Tvåspråkighet med förhinder? Invandrar- och minoritetsundervisning i Sverige. Studentlitteratur 1996. . s. 148—186. Universitetet i Tromsø
 Svonni, Mikael. Samiska skolbarns samiska. En undersökning av minoritetsspråksbehärskning i en språkbyteskontext. Umeå Studies in the Humanities 113. Stockholm: Almqvist&Wiksell 1993.
 Svonni, Mikael. Sámi-ruoŧa, ruoŧa-sámi sátnegirji : Samisk-svensk, svensk-samisk ordbok. Jokkmokk: Sámi Girjjit 1990. Universitetet i Tromsø, 266 s.

References

External links 
 Samtal med Mikael Svonni på Bokmässan i Göteborg den 26 september 2014
 Ravda Lágádus

1950 births
Living people
Academic staff of Umeå University
Academic staff of the University of Tromsø
Swedish Sámi people
Linguists of Sámi
Swedish Sámi academics